"December, 2014 (The Winter’s Tale)" is a song by South Korean–Chinese boy band Exo, released on December 19, 2014, for their first live album Exology Chapter 1: The Lost Planet. It was the first single not to feature members Kris and Luhan due to their lawsuits months before.

Background and release 
On December 15, 2014, it was revealed that EXO will be releasing "December, 2014 (The Winter’s Tale)" through the mobile rhythm game SuperStar SMTOWN as an OST. A teaser of the song was also released on the same day. The song is recorded by D.O., Baekhyun and Chen with the lyrics of meeting the loved one again after going around the world.

Reception 
"December, 2014 (The Winter’s Tale)" debuted at number one on the Gaon Weekly Digital Chart, and at number fourteen at the Billboard World Digital Songs chart.

Charts

Weekly charts

Monthly charts

Sales

Accolades

Music program awards

References 

Exo songs
2014 songs
2014 singles
Korean-language songs
SM Entertainment singles